Ctenophorus butlerorum, also known commonly as Butler's dragon, the Shark Bay heath dragon and the Edel heath dragon, is a species of lizard in the family Agamidae. The species is endemic to Australia.

Etymology
The specific name, butlerorum (Latin, genitive plural), is in honor of Australian naturalist William Henry "Harry" Butler and his wife Margaret Butler.

Habitat and geographic range
C. butlerorum is found in dunes and sandplains of the mid-west coast of Western Australia between Shark Bay and Kalbarri.

Reproduction
The mode of reproduction of C. butlerorum is unknown.

References

Further reading
Cogger HG (2014). Reptiles and Amphibians of Australia, Seventh Edition. Clayton, Victoria, Australia: CSIRO Publishing. xxx + 1,033 pp. .
Storr GM (1977). "The Amphibolurus adelaidensis species group (Lacertilia, Agamidae) in Western Australia". Records of the Western Australian Museum 5 (1): 73–81. (Amphibolurus parviceps butleri, new subspecies, pp. 75–77, Figure 1).

Agamid lizards of Australia
butlerorum
Endemic fauna of Australia
Reptiles described in 1977
Taxa named by Glen Milton Storr